Gittelde is a village and a former municipality in the district of Göttingen, in Lower Saxony, Germany. Since 1 March 2013, it is part of the municipality Bad Grund.

History 
Gittelde was founded in the 10th century. In a document dating from 953 the place was mentioned for the first time, and a few years later market and mint rights were awarded in 965.

Sights 
There are many well-preserved half-timbered houses in the center of the town, e.g. in Breite Strasse street, a comparatively broad street which might have been an oblong market as the town has never had a rectangular market place like other market towns. Lange Straße is another historic street with traditional half-timbered houses. Some houses have doors with colourful wood carvings.

St. Mauritius Church, which was founded in the Middle Ages, has a neoromanic nave dating from the 19th century. Its spire was built in a baroque style around 1700. Inside the church a gothic altar with wood carvings can be seen. St. Johannes Church which was possibly founded in the 10th century has a spire dating from 1660.

The railway station of Gittelde on the Herzberg–Seesen railway line is a historic wooden building in the southeast of the town.

The ruins of Stauffenburg Castle are worth a visit as well. The castle was founded shortly after 1050. It was used as a prison until 1778 and as a quarry afterwards.

References

Former municipalities in Lower Saxony
Populated places disestablished in 2013